Dmitry Lotsmanov (born March 2, 1975, Armavir) is a Russian political figure and a deputy of the 8th State Duma.

From 1994 to 2004, Lotsmanov engaged in business and worked in the company Kuban-Union Business, where he held positions from regional representative to deputy general director of the company. From 2004 to 2021, he worked at the  Kubankhleb, founded by his father Nikolai Lotsmanov. In 2004-2008, he was the deputy of the Tikhoretsk City Council. In 2017-2021, Lotsmanov was the deputy of the Legislative Assembly of Krasnodar Krai. Since September 2021, he has served as deputy of the 8th State Duma.

In 2021, Dmitry Lotsmanov was ranked 39th in the Forbes ranking of the wealthiest civil servants in Russia.

References

1975 births
Living people
United Russia politicians
21st-century Russian politicians
Eighth convocation members of the State Duma (Russian Federation)
People from Armavir, Russia